Winston may refer to:

Places

Antarctica

 Winston Glacier

Australia 

 Winston, Queensland, a suburb of the City of Mount Isa

United Kingdom

 Winston, County Durham, England, a village

 Winston, Suffolk, England, a village and civil parish

United States

 Winston, Florida, a former census-designated place
 Winston, Georgia, an unincorporated community
 Winston, Missouri, a village
 Winston, Montana, a census-designated place
 Winston, New Mexico
 Winston, Oregon, a city
 Winston County, Alabama
 Winston County, Mississippi
 Winston-Salem, North Carolina

People
 Winston (name)

Other uses
Cyclone Winston (February 2016), category 5 tropical cyclone in the South Pacific
Republic of Winston, referring to resistance in Winston County, Alabama to the Confederacy during the American Civil War
USS Winston (AKA-94), an Andromeda-class attack cargo ship
Winston (cigarette)
Winston (band), a Canadian indie pop band
Winston (horse) a horse ridden by Queen Elizabeth II
Winston Cup, the name of a NASCAR racing series between 1972 and 2003
The Winston, now known as the NASCAR Sprint All-Star Race
Winston 500 (disambiguation), referring to two different NASCAR Sprint Cup races
Winston Broadcasting Network, a company that owns one television station in the midwestern United States
Winston Science Fiction, a line of young-adult titles from John C. Winston Publishers
Winston Tunnel, a railroad tunnel in Illinois
Winston Tower, a skyscraper in Winston-Salem, North Carolina
Winston Theatre, University of Bristol
Winston School (Lakeland, Florida), on the National Register of Historic Places
Winston Preparatory School, New York City
The Winston School, a private coeducational day school in Dallas, Texas
Winston (apple), a variety of russet apple
Ramu III, a whale also known as Winston
Winston (yacht), a yacht
John C. Winston Company, an American publishing company, later part of Holt Rinehart & Winston

See also
Winston Manor (disambiguation)
Winstone